Andrew Form (born 3 February 1969) is an American film producer, best known for producing the films Friday the 13th, Teenage Mutant Ninja Turtles, and The Purge. He is the co-founder of company Platinum Dunes along with Michael Bay and Brad Fuller.

Career
Form began working in the film industry as a production assistant for producer Jerry Bruckheimer and Bruckheimer's late producing partner Don Simpson.

Form founded the production company Platinum Dunes with filmmakers Michael Bay and Brad Fuller in 2001. Platinum Dunes is known for producing reboots of popular horror films such as The Texas Chainsaw Massacre (2003), The Amityville Horror (2005), Friday the 13th (2009) and A Nightmare on Elm Street (2010).

He is also known for producing original film series such as The Purge, Ouija (2014), A Quiet Place (2018) and its 2020 sequel. He co-produced the television series Black Sails (2014–2017) and Jack Ryan (2018–present). In 2015, The Hollywood Reporter called him one of the "30 Most Powerful Film Producers in Hollywood".

In 2018, Form and Fuller started Fully Formed Entertainment together. The company signed a three-year deal with Paramount Pictures beginning in 2019. Form left the venture in 2020, when he entered talks to join John Krasinski's Sunday Night Productions.

He is also producing the upcoming film A Quiet Place: Day One, which Krasinski will write, direct and star in.

Personal life 
Form met actress Jordana Brewster on the set of The Texas Chainsaw Massacre: The Beginning, which Form produced. They announced their engagement on November 4, 2006, and married in the Bahamas on May 6, 2007. Their first son was born in September 2013, and their second in June 2016. Brewster filed for divorce in mid-2020. The divorce was finalized in June 2021. His engagement to Alexandra Daddario was announced on December 2, 2021. The pair married in June 2022.

Filmography

References

External links 
 

Place of birth missing (living people)
American film producers
American film production company founders
Living people
1969 births